Birthday Song may refer to:

birthday song
List of birthday songs

Songs
Birthday Song (2 Chainz song), Kanye West 2012
"Birthday Song", song by Don McLean, McLean 1975, And I Love You So (Don McLean album), covered Mike Douglas	1974
"Birthday Song", song by Kim Wilde, Ricki Wilde, Kim Wilde 1992
"Birthday Song", song by Matthew Ellis (British musician), Ellis	1971